Gladstone Pereira della Valentina (born 29 January 1985), known simply as Gladstone, is a Brazilian professional footballer who plays for Vitória-ES as a centre back.

Club career
Born in Vila Velha, Espírito Santo, Gladstone started playing professionally with Cruzeiro Esporte Clube at the age of 18. From then onwards he started a series of consecutive loans, starting in the 2005–06 season in Italy: first with Juventus F.C. and, after no appearances, with Hellas Verona FC, but the former club chose not to activate the pre-set price of €2 million, one of the reasons being the impending 2006 Italian football scandal; he subsequently returned to Cruzeiro, signing a new three-year deal.

In 2007–08, Gladstone was loaned out again, this time to Sporting CP, where he rarely played due to the presence of compatriot Ânderson Polga and Tonel. Mainly used as a late substitute, he still managed to score once, in a 4–1 Primeira Liga home win against Associação Naval 1º de Maio; after the campaign finished and he helped his team finish second, he closed the year with another loan, at Sociedade Esportiva Palmeiras.

Gladstone moved on 19 January 2009, still owned by Cruzeiro, to Clube Náutico Capibaribe. On 13 February of the following year his contract with the Belo Horizonte side expired, and he returned to Europe, signing for three years with FC Vaslui in Romania.

From 2013 and until his retirement, save for one year back in the Portuguese top division with Gil Vicente FC, Gladstone competed exclusively in the Brazilian lower leagues.

International career
Gladstone was a member of the Brazil under-20 squad at the 2005 FIFA World Youth Championship in the Netherlands, taking home the bronze medal. On 15 November 2006, he was called up to the full side as an injury replacement for the friendly match with Switzerland, but did not make his debut.

On 6 September 2007, Gladstone was again picked by manager Dunga for the games against Mexico and the United States, but did not receive any playing time as well.

Honours
Cruzeiro
Campeonato Brasileiro Série A: 2003
Copa do Brasil: 2003
Campeonato Mineiro: 2003, 2004

Sporting
Taça de Portugal: 2007–08
Supertaça Cândido de Oliveira: 2007

Vaslui
Cupa României: Runner-up 2009–10

FOOTBALL CAREER TRANSFERS AND STATISTICS 
We are going to show you the list of football clubs and seasons in which Gladstone Pereira Della Valentina has played. It includes the total number of appearance (caps), substitution details, goals, yellow and red cards stats.

References

External links
CBF data 

1985 births
Living people
People from Vila Velha
Brazilian people of Italian descent
Brazilian footballers
Association football defenders
Campeonato Brasileiro Série A players
Campeonato Brasileiro Série B players
Campeonato Brasileiro Série C players
Campeonato Brasileiro Série D players
Cruzeiro Esporte Clube players
Sociedade Esportiva Palmeiras players
Clube Náutico Capibaribe players
Associação Portuguesa de Desportos players
ABC Futebol Clube players
Clube de Regatas Brasil players
Associação Desportiva Cabofriense players
Guarani FC players
Mogi Mirim Esporte Clube players
Villa Nova Atlético Clube players
Botafogo Futebol Clube (SP) players
Botafogo Futebol Clube (PB) players
União Recreativa dos Trabalhadores players
Clube Atlético Votuporanguense players
Vitória Futebol Clube (ES) players
Serie B players
Juventus F.C. players
Hellas Verona F.C. players
Primeira Liga players
Sporting CP footballers
Gil Vicente F.C. players
Liga I players
FC Vaslui players
Brazil youth international footballers
Brazil under-20 international footballers
Brazilian expatriate footballers
Expatriate footballers in Italy
Expatriate footballers in Portugal
Expatriate footballers in Romania
Brazilian expatriate sportspeople in Italy
Brazilian expatriate sportspeople in Portugal
Brazilian expatriate sportspeople in Romania
Sportspeople from Espírito Santo